Wolanowski is a Jewish Polish surname. Notable people with the surname include:

 Lucjan Wilhelm Wolanowski (1920–2006), Polish journalist
  (1844–1900)

Jewish surnames
Polish-language surnames